Humphrey Dennis McQueen (born 26 June 1942) is an Australian public intellectual. Over the course of his career he has written histories, biographies and cultural criticism. McQueen was the pivotal figure in the development of the Australian New Left. His most iconic work, A New Britannia, gained notoriety for challenging the dominant approach to Australian history developed by the Old Left. He has written books on history, the media, politics and the visual arts. Although McQueen began his career as an academic at the Australian National University under Manning Clark, most of his career has been as an independent scholar.

Early life

McQueen was born in Brisbane to a working-class family that was active in the Australian Labor Party. His father was Dinny "Horse" McQueen (1899-1971), a tanner and assistant bookmaker who knew John Wren. Dinny was a long-time member of the Leather and Allied Trades Union who, along with his working wife and McQueen's mother, was recruited to the ALP in the 1950s by a Grouper (although his politics was communistic). McQueen was educated at Marist College Ashgrove and was a contemporary of future PNG prime minister Julius Chan. He joined the ALP at the age of fifteen, and was instrumental in establishing the Queensland Young Labor organisation and was editor of its newsletter. In 1961, McQueen served as the ALP campaign organiser for the seat of Ryan.

Early career

Before academia
McQueen's first job was as a clerk, third division, at the Department of Social Services in 1960. He left the Commonwealth Public Service soon afterwards to undertake a Bachelor of Arts degree at the University of Queensland where he graduated with Honours degree in 1965. The 'burly, goatee bearded...freethinker' was suspended from the University in 1962 when he reproduced the opinions of Peter Kenny, an Australian Broadcasting Corporation researcher, in 1962. Kenny had argued that the existence of a god was debatable and that homosexuality should be celebrated as much as heterosexuality. The panel appointed to judge the 'bearded' McQueen found him guilty but declined to punish him.

McQueen was an active participant in the anti-Vietnam War movement in Australia, campaigning against conscription as chairman of the Melbourne-based Revolutionary Socialist Group in 1968. His organisational engagement shaped his interest in Maoist and Gramscian theory, influencing his subsequent historical work. He had also been secretary the Vietnam Day Committee in Melbourne when it held a vigil outside the United States Consulate and picketed the Defence Standards Laboratories in 1967. From 1966 to 1969 he was employed as a teacher at Glen Waverley High in Victoria.

Academia

McQueen's political activism in the 1960s led him to join academia in 1970. His first Marxist critique was a paper in 1967, Which Party for Socialists?, arguing against the ALP. His first academic article came in 1968 when the political economist Bruce McFarlane invited McQueen to write an article in Labour History. The article, Convicts and Rebels, contested the Australian Whig history associated with the Old Left. In the article, McQueen doubted the authenticity of a democratic and egalitarian tradition emanating from Australia’s convict history. He challenged the egalitarian aspect of the tradition, highlighting the prominence of racism in convict society.

In 1970, he moved to Canberra, where he taught Australian history as a senior tutor at the Australian National University from 1970-1974. He met and befriended the historian, Manning Clark. Soon after starting at the University, McQueen registered his disapproval of the History Department's decision to allow the Faculty of Military Studies at Royal Military College, Duntroon to join ANU (it was affiliated already with UNSW). Although many agreed with McQueen's argument that Duntroon did not allow the right to free thought, fundamental to the liberal conception of a university, the Department approved the request.

McQueen’s early academic writing was intent on dispelling the approaches to labour history generated by the Australian Old Left, especially Russel Ward's The Australian Legend. McQueen was head-hunted by the political scientist, Henry Mayer, to write a book after he read McQueen's articles "Convicts and Rebels" and "A Race Apart". McQueen wrote A New Britannia, an historical analysis of the emergence and development of the Australian labour movement. It influentially argued that the history of the Australian labour movement, from colonisation to Australian federation (1788-1901), should be understood as an extension of Imperialism within the British Empire. The argument challenged existing account of the labour movement emerging from the Australian Old Left, which had mythologised the nation-building and democratic nature of the movement. In seeking to challenge accounts of Australian history presented in the Old Left, McQueen established the grounds to contest the Whig tradition in Australian scholarship. He identified that British imperialism cannot be separated from the experience of capitalism in Australia, and that Australian identity should be reconsidered in light of the role that racism and Patriarchy had played in development of the Australian labour movement. Together with an application of British New Left theorists, Perry Anderson and Tom Nairn, the approach redefined the nature of Australian historical enquiry, which would prove to be influential in the discipline of history.

Receptions of the book were mixed. Terry Irving in reviewing A New Britannia, highlighted the work’s theoretical legacy, but also the need to produce a more developed theoretical engagement. He stated that A New Britannia "Will provoke angry discussion, but I hope it will also provoke the new left to develop the methodology necessary to write a new history". This observation would influence the development of another hallmark of the Australian New Left, Class Structure in Australian History. The Papua New Guinea Post-Courier said, 'Mr Humphrey McQueen is a very angry young man, and there is plenty of justification for this in Australia.' The Canberra Times said, 'In order to encompass such a wide range McQueen has obviously left gaps in his argument, but this matters little... He is concerned to show that the projection of radicalism and nationalism into socialism and anti-imperialism is mythical. This he does, as others have done, but will such attacks ever kill the myth?' Rowan Cahill in Tribune said, 'The trouble is when you dash around frantically from one battlefield to another, like as not you'll end up shooting the wrong people. I believe this is what he has done... McQueen notes that revolutionaries in power have sometimes distorted history in order to stay there; I add the note that in attempting to search out a strategy for coming to power we have to be careful that something similar is not also done.' The journalist W.A. Wood in Tribune attacked the book calling McQueen 'Mr Justice McQueen'.

In 1971, McQueen wrote a review against Christopher Hitchens calling his work on Marx 'acceptable as a fourth year honours
essay but it would not be remarkable even as that' and 'it would be useful for a student with no more than an hour to prepare for a tutorial on the subject.' McQueen said of his teaching style, 'History is a study of the development of
society — the society as a whole ... the bourgeoisie have isolated and categorized scholarship in such a way as to eliminate the study of the interaction of all social factors, environment, politics and economics... my course is designed to restore histor-y to a study of society as a whole.' 

McQueen called for a boycott of the 1972 election because the ALP under Gough Whitlam would be 'even more imperialist
in its policy towards South East Asia.' Mungo McCallum said McQueen was 'a middle-class academic putting forward views, on the ideal society but without suggesting realistic proposals to attain it.' McQueen was charged along with 8 undergraduates for encouraging people to defy the draft, but charges was later dropped. Along with his long-time friend, Bruce McFarlane and others, he contributed to a five-part series on Marx aired by ABC Radio Two in 1973 which became a book.

Independent career

By 1978, McQueen had left ANU and had shifted away from his earlier work as he became increasingly influence by Maoism. This led McQueen to depart from A New Britannia and the Gramscian New Left, a process he described in the 2004 edition. McQueen believed in a fusion between the philosophical and economic Marx, which was a midway between the two competing interpretations of Marxism that had preoccupied radicals since the 1920s. McQueen's fourth book was Social Sketches of Australia (1978), a social history of Australia since the late nineteenth century. Continuing on from early work, Social Sketches was a correction to the secondary source focus of A New Britannia, focusing instead on primary sources and the perspectives of minorities.

McQueen's work since the 1970s has been varied, ranging from historiographical works to art history and the importance of British slavery to the development of capitalism.

Personal life

McQueen was married to Judy McQueen.

Bibliography

McQueen contributed a chapter entitled "Born free: wage-slaves and chattel-slaves" to Foundational Fictions in South Australian History (2018).

References

External links
Website of Humphrey McQueen: Surplus Value
Radioshow hosted by McQueen: Solidarity Breakfast
List of McQueen's papers held at the National Library of Australia
Guardian article by McQueen: healthcare is not a product no matter what neoliberalism has taught us
Green Left Weekly article: Humphrey McQueen: WikiLeaks and the fight for free speech

1942 births
Living people
20th-century Australian historians
People from Brisbane
Australian Marxists
Australian Marxist historians
New Left
Australian anti-war activists
University of Queensland alumni
Academic staff of the Australian National University
Australian schoolteachers